Weezer is an American rock band. The name may also refer to any of the six eponymous albums by the band:

 Weezer (Blue Album), 1994
 Weezer (Green Album), 2001
 Weezer (Red Album), 2008
 Weezer (White Album), 2016
 Weezer (Teal Album), January 2019
 Weezer (Black Album), March 2019